João Afonso Telo de Meneses (1200s-1268) was a Portuguese nobleman, 2nd Lord of Albuquerque,
and alferes-mor of Afonso III of Portugal.

Biography 
João was the son of Alfonso Téllez de Meneses and Teresa Sanches, daughter of Sancho I of Portugal. His wife was Elvira González Girón, daughter of Rodrigo Gutiérrez Girón (Butler of Alfonso VIII of Castile).

João Afonso Telo de Meneses, was the grandson of Tello Pérez de Meneses.

References 

1200s births
1268 deaths
13th-century Portuguese people
Portuguese nobility
Portuguese Roman Catholics